Myrmeleon is an ant-lion genus in the subfamily Myrmeleontinae. Species in the genus feed on ants and some are themselves prey for the dune cricket Schizodactylus inexspectatus.

Species

See also 
 Myrmecophagy

References

External links 

Myrmeleontidae genera
Myrmeleontinae